Michael Robert Payne (born 25 March 1958) is an English and Irish marketing executive and author, for many years head of the marketing division of the International Olympic Committee (IOC) and from 2004 through 2016 with Formula One Group. He is the author of the 2005 book Olympic Turnaround and 2021 book "Toon In!" and contributes widely to the media on sports business issues.

Biography
Payne was educated at Highgate School. A British free-style skiing champion in the 1970's, he began marketing his fellow athletes, helping them find sponsors to permit them to compete. Payne was drafted into the IOC in the 1989, having previously worked at ISL Marketing , a Swiss based marketing company that in 1982 had been appointed by the IOC to develop a global marketing program. During his 17 years with the IOC, he contributed to the development of a multi-billion marketing program for the organisation, worldwide. According to media outlets, Payne is "credited with turning the Games into a financial success" through the television and marketing deals he negotiated for the Olympics during his tenure.

After the 2004 Summer Olympics, he took a position with Bernie Ecclestone, who holds the commercial rights for the Formula One brand. He remained an advisor for the IOC.

In 2004 Payne also founded his global strategic advisory group, Payne Sports Media Strategies, advising governments, corporations, broadcaster and sports organisations, including Formula One,  Alibaba, WPP, CVC amongst others. 

Payne also acted as senior advisor for the winning Olympic bids of London 2012, Rio de Janeiro 2016 and Los Angeles 2028.

In 2005 Payne released his first book, Olympic Turnaroundthat details how the Olympics stepped back from the brink of extinction to become the world’s best known brand and a multi billion global franchise. The book has been published in more than 15 different languages.

In 2021 Payne released his second book, Toon In! that in 2022 won the prestigious Sunday Times Sports Book of the Year Award (8) detailing the Olympic history through cartoons and how the Games have defied threats. All profits donated to charity – Back Up, Sport for Peace, Yunus Sports Hub and Cartooning for Peace. 

Nominated by Advertising Age, as one of the World’s 50 most influential marketeers, he has also written for leading newspapers including the Financial Times, Yomuiri Shimbun (Japan) and Forbes. He has interviewed for over 100 media outlets including flagship television news programmes in the US (NBC, CNN) UK (BBC, Newsnight, Panorama) Canada (CBC) Australia (Channel 7) Japan (NHK, TV Tokyo) China (CCTV)  and Bloomberg, New York Times, Wall St Journal, The Guardian, Sunday Times, L'Equipe,, AP, AFP, Reuters amongst others where he is frequently called upon to comment on the business of sport and politics and sport. He is also a regular speaker at international conferences.

He has served on a number of boards including advisory board to Imperial College London; Chairman of Crystal Digital International.

References

English businesspeople
English writers
Living people
People educated at Highgate School
1958 births